Edgardo Luciano Ocampo (October 5, 1938 – July 29, 1992) was a Filipino basketball player and coach.

Early life and education
Ocampo was born in Pampanga, Philippines on October 5, 1938. He was one of four children of renowned architect Fernando H. Ocampo and Lourdes Luciano. He was educated at the Ateneo de Manila (GS 1951, HS 1955, BSBA 1959).

Playing career

Football
During his grade school years, Ocampo became interested in basketball and football. He tried out for the grade school basketball team, but did not pass the height requirement. Instead, he made it into the football squad where, his brilliance in the field became apparent. By the age of seventeen, Ocampo was acclaimed by sportswriters as “Mr. Football”. He was a member of the Philippine football team that toured Korea and Spain in 1956.

Track and field

He was also active in track and field during his school years.

Basketball

In 1956, Ocampo broke his clavicle during a football game and was advised by doctors to cease from sports for six months. While recuperating, Ocampo decided to join the school’s basketball team. Ocampo officially joined the team during the second round of the 1957 NCAA basketball season. He led the team to back-to-back NCAA men's basketball championships in 1957 and 1958. Ocampo became the first team captain to be called King Eagle.

After graduation in 1959, he joined the fabled YCO Painters in the Manila Industrial and Commercial Athletic Association during its prime era. He was part of the YCO championship teams of the 1960s and remained with the franchise until 1973/1974.

Philippine men’s basketball team

Ocampo was a regular member of the Philippines men's national basketball team from 1959 to 1972. He first joined the Philippine team that placed 8th at the 1959 FIBA World Championship held in Chile and was a member of three Philippine teams that won the Asian Basketball Confederation championships - 1960, 1963 and 1967. He was also a three-time Olympian - 1960 (11th place), 1968 (13th place) and 1972 (13th place).

Ocampo was mentioned in Jose Ma. Bonifacio Escoda's book, Basketball History: Philippines, as one of the finest guards the country has ever produced and a gentleman in and outside the hard court. Though not a scorer, his leech-like guarding helped the national team of 1967 to regain the ABC crown by limiting Shin Dong-pa, South Korea's six-foot-one scoring machine to just 12 points.

Coaching career

Ocampo began his coaching career with the YCO Painters in 1975, winning the MICAA championship that year against Manila Bank in July.

He became head coach of Royal Tru-Orange in the Philippine Basketball Association in 1978 and won his first PBA championship during the 1979 PBA Open conference. This was the first PBA championship of the San Miguel Corporation franchise, currently the franchise with the most number of PBA championships (25).

In 1981, Ocampo became head coach of Toyota and won three more PBA championships. He later coached Manila Beer (1985), Shell (1986-1987) and Pepsi (1990).

Personal life

Ocampo was married to the former Maria Lourdes Trinidad.

Death
Ocampo died on July 29, 1992, at the age of 53.

Honors
 Ateneo Sports Hall of Fame (1982)  
 National Basketball Hall of Fame (1999)
 PBA Hall of Fame (2013)

References

Further reading
 Views from the Pampang

External links
 

1938 births
1999 deaths

Filipino men's basketball coaches
Shell Turbo Chargers coaches
Ateneo Blue Eagles men's basketball players
Olympic basketball players of the Philippines
Basketball players at the 1960 Summer Olympics
Basketball players at the 1968 Summer Olympics
Basketball players at the 1972 Summer Olympics
Basketball players at the 1966 Asian Games
Philippines men's national basketball team players
Filipino men's basketball players
1959 FIBA World Championship players
Filipino footballers
Basketball players from Pampanga
Association footballers not categorized by position
Asian Games competitors for the Philippines
Philippine Sports Hall of Fame inductees
Footballers at the 1958 Asian Games
San Miguel Beermen coaches
Toyota Super Corollas coaches
Manila Beer Brewmasters coaches
TNT Tropang Giga coaches